Viaweb was a web-based application that allowed users to build and host their own online stores with little technical expertise using a web browser. The company was started in July 1995 by Paul Graham, Robert Morris (using the pseudonym "John McArtyem"), and Trevor Blackwell. Graham claims Viaweb was the first application service provider. Viaweb was also unusual for being partially written in the Lisp programming language.

The software was originally called Webgen, but another company was using the same name, so the company renamed it to Viaweb, "because it worked via the Web".

In 1998, Yahoo! Inc. bought Viaweb for 455,000 shares of Yahoo! stock, valued at about $49 million, and renamed it Yahoo! Store.

Viaweb's example has been influential in Silicon Valley's entrepreneurial culture, largely due to Graham's widely read essays and his subsequent career as a successful venture capitalist.

See also
 List of mergers and acquisitions by Yahoo!
 RTML

References

External links
 
 

Discontinued Yahoo! services
Internet properties established in 1995
Web applications
Lisp (programming language) software
Yahoo! acquisitions